The 1998–99 Albanian National Championship was the 60th season of the Albanian National Championship, the top professional league for association football clubs, since its establishment in 1930. The season began on 29 August 1998 and concluded on 15 May 1999. Vllaznia began the season as defending champions of the 1997–98 season and Burreli was the only team promoted from the Kategoria e Dytë as the league was reduced from 18 teams to 16.

Tirana won their 18th Albanian title, having finished as runners-up during the previous season. The newly promoted club Burreli were the first team to be relegated, and they were followed by Laçi and Besa down to the Kategoria e Dytë.

Teams

Promotion and relegation
A total of 16 teams competed in the 1998–99 season, 2 less than the previous where 18 teams competed. Of these 16 teams, 15 of them were from the 1997–98 season with Burreli being the only promoted side from the Kategoria e Dytë. 3 sides from the 1997–98 season were relegated, and they were Shqiponja, Sopoti and Albpetrol.

Stadia and last season

League table

Results

Season statistics

Top scorers

Notes

References

Kategoria Superiore seasons
1
Albanian Superliga